Ali Tanrıyar (14 March 1914 – 25 May 2017) was a Turkish internist, politician, Interior Minister of Turkey, chairman of the sports club Galatasaray S.K.. and centenarian, having lived to 103.

Ali Tanrıyar was born in Ottoman Greece in 1914. He emigrated with his family, and settled in Kırkağaç district of Manisa Province, Turkey.

He was married with one child, two grandchildren, and celebrated his 100th birthday in 2014. Tanrıyar was the brother-in-law of former Turkish prime minister and president Turgut Özal.

Physician
He was educated in medicine at Istanbul University. Between 1944 and 1976, he specialized under Prof. Erich Frank (1884-1957) at the same university. In 1972, he was appointed internist at the Taksim Beyğğlu Emergebcy Hospital in Istanbul, where he served as clinic chief and chief physician until 1979. He also served free of charge 41 years as the club physician of Galatasaray S.K. from 1942 to 1983.

Politician
On May 20, 1983, he joined the founders of the Motherland Party (ANAP). He was elected a deputy of Istanbul into the parliament following the 1983 general elections. Tanrıyar was appointed Minister of the Interior in the Turgut Özal cabinet serving from December 13, 1983 to October 26, 1984. He was re-elected in the 1987 general elections.

Sports administrator
Tanrıyar served as a board member of the major sports club Galatasaray. In 1986, he became president of Galatasaray S.K., and served two terms at this position until 1990. The club enjoyed success in sportive and economic matters during his presidency. In the 1986-87 season, Galatasaray football team became league champion after 14 years again. In addition, the club won titles in 16 different sports branches in his term. The football team played semifinals at the 1988–89 European Cup as being the first ever Turkish club.

Death
He died on May 25, 2017, aged 103. He was buried at Zincirlikuyu Cemetery following a memorial ceremony in the Türk Telekom Arena, the home  ground of Galatasaray S.K., and the religious funeral at Teşvikiye Mosque on May 27, 2017.

See also
 List of Galatasaray S.K. presidents

References

1914 births
Macedonian Turks
Istanbul University Faculty of Medicine alumni
Turkish internists
Motherland Party (Turkey) politicians
Deputies of Istanbul
Ministers of the Interior of Turkey
Galatasaray S.K. presidents
2017 deaths
Turkish centenarians
Men centenarians
Burials at Zincirlikuyu Cemetery
People from Kavala (regional unit)